The Different Story (World of Lust and Crime) is the third English album by German singer Peter Schilling.

The English counterpart to the German album of the same name, The Different Story (World of Lust and Crime) is the last English album by Peter Schilling to date. All the songs but the title track are from previous albums. Peter later explained that he'd grown tired and needed a break by this point, possibly explaining why there was only 1 new track.

The title track was a collaborative effort between Peter Schilling and Enigma's Michael Cretu, and is the only song written and released in English only. "The Different Story (World of Lust and Crime)" was a Top 10 pop hit in Sweden. Released in a dance mix, the song was also a club hit, reaching #16 on the Billboard Dance chart. It was Schilling's last U.S. Hot 100 Pop hit to date, peaking at #61.

Reception
The number of copies the album sold were low. William Cooper from Allmusic says that besides the hit song Major Tom and the title track The Different Story (World of Lust and Crime), the "rest of the material here just isn't worth the trouble."

Track listing
 "The Different Story (World of Lust and Crime)" – 3:52
 "Major Tom (Coming Home)" – 4:59
 "The Noah Plan" – 4:22
 "City of Night (Berlin)" – 5:06
 "Lone Survivor" – 4:04
 "Terra Titanic (Lost to the Sea)" – 3:58
 "Zone 804" – 4:11
 "The Hurricane (Hammers on the Shore)" – 4:25
 "(Let's Play) U.S.A." – 3:17

References

1989 albums
Elektra Records albums
Peter Schilling albums